Anas Hamzaoui (born 14 July 1996) is a Belgian professional footballer who plays as a left-back for RAAL La Louvière.

Personal life
Born in Belgium, Hamzaoui is of Moroccan descent.

References

External links
 

1996 births
Living people
Belgian footballers
Belgian sportspeople of Moroccan descent
Challenger Pro League players
Belgian National Division 1 players
Association football defenders
A.F.C. Tubize players
Royale Union Saint-Gilloise players
R.E. Virton players
RAAL La Louvière players
Footballers from Brussels